Ndaté Yalla Mbodj also known as Ndateh Yalla Mbooj — 1860 or 1814—1856) was the last great Lingeer (Queen) of Waalo, one of the four Jolof kingdoms in present day Senegal  located in what is now North-West Senegal. During her reign, she fought against French colonization and Moorish invasion of her kingdom. In the 19th century,the Wolof queens Ndaté Yalla and her sister Ndjeumbeut Mbodj stood out as two of the most powerful women of 19th century Senegalese dynastic history.

Early life and family
Ndaté Yalla, usually cited by most historians as being born in c. 1810 (or 1814 according to François-Xavier Fauvelle) to the powerful and controversial King of Waalo Brak Amar Fatim Borso Mbodj, and the Lingeer-Awo Fatim Yamar Khuri Yaye Mbodj. Waalo was one of the four Wolof Kingdoms of present day Senegal along with Cayor, Baol and Jolof which was an empire before its decline to a kingdom. In Waalo, the kings were titled  Brak. The queens and royal princesses in Wolofs Kingdoms of present day Senegal dynastic/precolonial history were titled Lingeer. The Lingeer—Awo was the first wife of the king, and therefore, one of the most powerful women along with the king's mother and/or sister (if the queen mother is not alive). Awo in Wolof means first wife, and therefore, the first wife was the senior wife and the most powerful of all the king's wives. In Wolof they are called "Aawo/Awo", in Serer, they are called "Mawo". In fact,there is a Wolof proverb about the “Aawo”, it says “Aawo Buuru Këram" which for the Wolofs who were as most Africans, polygamous even bofore Islam, “first wife, Queen of her house or of the house". In the Wolof Kingdoms, and in the serer kingdoms of Sine and Saloum prior to their Islamization, the lingeer, whether ruling in her own right as queen regnant or as the wife of a king (queen consort) had to be crowned lingeer just as the king was crowned brak (or Buur Sine and Buur Saloum - in Sine and Saloum respectively).

Ndaté Yalla was the youngest daughter of King Amar Fatim Borso Mbodj to his first wife Fatim Yamar Khuri Yaye. Her elder sister was Ndjeumbeut Mbodj who was later married off to the Emir of Trarza. 
The Brak, Amar Fatim Borso belonged to the powerful, yet controversial Joos Maternal Dynasty of Waalo, which was one of the reigning Houses of Waalo at the time. The Wolof Kingdom of Waalo was ruled by the Wolof Mbodj (or Mbooj) paternal dynasty — direct paternal descendants of Barka Bo, the first Brak of Waalo and maternal half-brother of Ndiadiane Ndiaye - founder of the Jolof Empire. Barka Bo and Ndiadiane's mother was Fatoumata Sall, daughter of the Lamtoro of Futa Abraham Sall - who was a Toucolueur. There is a problem of Chronology regarding his “mother”. How was Ndiadiane Ndiaye the son of the daughter of a Lam toro called Fatoumata Sall when the “Lam toro” did not exist in 1200s or 1300s?   The lam toro is a contemporary feature or function to Koli Tengala (16th century). Ndiadiane Ndiaye whom historians place between the 13th and 14th centuries cannot be born centuries before his mother. So this information from some versions of the oral tradition, may not be accurate.It could have been an attempt by the Wolofs to incorporate other ethnicities into the myth of the consolidator of the Wolof Jolof empire Ndiadiane Ndiaye to make them more comfortable with being vassals of the Jolof empire. Barka Mbodj was the son of Mbarick Mbodj. Mbarick Mbodj was an ancestor of Ndaté Yalla Mbodj.On the maternal side, all the kings or queens of Waalo had to belong to one of the three maternal dynasties or royal houses that had ruled over Waalo for nearly 600. The Wolof who were conscious that they ruled multi-ethnic territoires chose lineages that were multi ethnic, so it was Wolof men from the royal family of Waalo marrying Wolof women who had multi ethnic ancestry from the following maternal lineages:Tedyek (of Fula or Berber origin),  Loggar (of Moorish origin) and Joos (of Serer origin). Ndaté Yalla's father belonged to the Joos Maternal Dynasty, and a direct maternal descendant of Lingeer Ndoye Demba - a Wolof Lebou or a Serer Princess of Sine, matriarch and founder of the Joos Dynasty of Waalo and Queen of that kingdom, herself the maternal grand daughter of  Lingeer Fatim Beye - a Serer Queen of Sine. Thus, Ndaté Yalla is related to the Joof and Faye royal families that had ruled Sine and Saloum, just as she is related to almost all the Senegalese royal families, as these families used to give their sons and daughters in marriage to each other. In fact Saloum, a Serer kingdom had several Wolof kings due to these intermarriages because the Serers  only determine ancestry and royal inheritance by the maternal lineage in contrast to the Wolofs who determine ancestry and royal inheritance by both the meen (maternal lineage) and the Geño (paternal lineage).

On Ndaté Yalla's maternal side, she belonged to the Tedyek (or Teejeg) matriclan through her Wolof Lingeer mother Fatim Yamar Khuri Yaye (or Faatim Yamar Xuuri Yaay). Lingeer Guet May Beut is their ancestor and matriarch of that House. Dégèune Mbodj is the ancestor and matriarch of the Loggars.

Ndaté Yalla's father - Amar Fatim Borso died in January 1826 when Ndaté Yalla and her sister  Ndjeumbeut were youths. He was especially known for his anti-Islamic stance against the Senegalese Muslim jihadist at the time — especially the Almamy of Futa (Almamy Biran), and for his famous line  "A Brak should never convert to Islam".

When Ndaté Yalla was just over 16 years of age, she married her cousin and King of Waalo - Brak  Yerim Mbanyik Tigereleh Mbodj (or Yerim Mbagnik Tegg Rell). That marriage was however a political marriage in order to advance Tedyek power.

Ndaté Yalla would go on to remarry to Sakoura Barka Diop better known as Marosso Tassé Diop, the Prince of Cayor and Lord of Koki, who was a relative of Lat Dior Diop (future King of Cayor and Baol) and Sayerr Jobe - founder of Sere Kunda in the Gambia. Marosso Tassé, a warrior noble of Cayor would go on to command his wife's army against Moorish and eminent French threat in years to come. From that marriage, they had Sidia Diop. Marosso Tassé was also a rather powerful and influential figure in Waalo, also known for being a valiant warrior.

Reign 
Queen Ndate was crowned Lingeer of Waalo on 1 October 1846 in Nder, the capital of Waalo. She succeeded her elder sister Ndjeumbeut Mbodj as Lingeer, reigning as Lingeer from 1846 to 1855 (the year Waalo fell to the French).

In early 1847, she opposed the French authorities over free passage for the Sarakoles (Soninkes) who supplied the Island of Saint-Louis (a French colony) with cattle. In a letter deposited at the Senegalese National Archives (Archives nationales du Sénégal - 13 G 91, Lettre N°. 61), the French claim that, the Queen and/or her people, going in contravention of the treaty that had existed between Waalo and Saint-Louis (Senegal),  stopped a herd of 160 oxen that a resident of Saint-Louise (a French man) had bought from some Sarakole merchants and kept 16 of the best livestock for themselves, allowing only 100 to pass. The French went on to state that,  the Queen can only be paid for passage after the goods have arrived in Saint-Louis. They then went on to threaten the Queen and asked that she return the 16 oxen which they say were in her possession, and if she refuse to do so she will be deemed an enemy. The Queen viewed the threat as an affront to her sovereignty and the sovereignty of Waalo.  On 18 June 1847, she wrote a letter to the French governor in the following terms:

During her reign as Lingeer, she and her husband Maaroso Tassé (commander of her army) fought against the Moors of Trazar who were encroaching on her territory and against the French colonialist army led by General Louis Faidherbe - who has just been brought in (1854) to replace his predecessor Governor Protet. Their years of resistance against colonization resulted in attacks from 1854 and finally the Battle of Dioubouldy (or Diouboulou or Dyubuldu) in 1855.  Maaroso Tassé, the Prince of Cayor and Lord of Koki, and commander of the Waalo army, put up a strong resistance against the French. The battle went on for several months. This battle was the first real attempt by France to conquer the Senegambia and bring to an end the six main Senegambian Kingdoms (Waalo, Sine, Saloum, Baol, Cayor and Jolof) and their respective royal dynasties that have reigned for centuries.  At the time, Waalo was the only kingdom truly led by a woman (a Queen). The others were led by Kings. Waalo was also close to Saint Louis (a French stronghold). Therefore, Faidherbe decided to exercise his authority first with Waalo. if Waalo fell, it would have been the first of the Senegambian kingdoms to fall, and although it did, it was not as easy as the French thought it was going to be. Waalo was one of two Senegambian kingdoms that gave birth to the Jolof Empire, the other being the Serer Kingdom of Sine. Ndiadiane Ndiaye, the founder of the Empire originated from Waalo. Howsoever, he got his name from the Sere King of Sine Maysa Wali Manneh, and Sine was the first to pledge allegiance to Ndiadiane and asked him to lead the confederacy and asked other kingdoms to allow Ndiadiane to lead the confederacy. Waalo therefore had a very ancient past, and it was one of the few (if not the only) Wolof kingdom that was truly democratic, where those from the bottom of the social strata can rise to the top - unlike the other three Wolof kingdoms (Cayor, Jolof, and Baol (previously a Serer kingdom ruled by the Joof family)). The country was also rich in other natural resources which made up its economic base i.e.  indigo, millet, cotton, melon, sugar cane, gum arabic, and fish. Fishing was very profitable as Waalo has a coastline that touches the Atlantic Ocean. For the royal family of Waalo, there was a lot at stake.

After several skirmishes, Maroso Tassé and his wife refused to submit to French invasion and mobilized more forces in order to repulse the French army. In February 1855, Faidherbe departed from Saint-Louis with a force of 450 French soldiers and 400 armed volunteers in order to march of Nder, Queen Ndaté's capital. On 25 February at the Battle of Dioubouldy, the French defeated the combined Waalo and Trarza armies. The French then entered Nder, which had been deserted by the Queen and her followers, and burned it down. Maroso Tassé and his warriors still held firm and refused to submit. The Queen who was receiving updates still remained defiant. On 31 January 1855, Faidherbe finally defeated the Queen and gained control of Waalo. Having been defeated, the Queen gave the following speech in front of her dignitaries:

The Prince of Cayor - Maaroso Tassé Diop lost many of his men in battle. For him and his wife, their defeat was the ultimate "defeat" and "humiliation in a country which had known only glory and honour." In addition to that, their young son was held hostage by the French, baptized a Christian and adding the name Lêon to his name to give Sidia Léeon Diop, and then sent to a French school abroad. He would later request a return to his country and later launched a campaign of attacks against the French. In-light of their defeat and the total humiliation of Waalo, under the advice of the Jogomay, Jawdin and Maalo (the three powerful noble council of electors responsible for electing the kings and queens of Waalo from the ruling family) and Maaroso Tassé's own relatives - the royal family of Cayor, requested that the royal couple move to Cayor for refuge and protection. They left for Cayor, and received protection from their relatives. The French demanded that the royal family of Cayor hand them over as their prisoners, and if they refuse to do so Cayor would be deemed an enemy. The royal family of Cayor refused to do so and offered them protection. The Queen remained in Cayor for several years until her death in 1860.

Despite their defeat and the total humiliation of their monarch, the Cheddos (or Tiedos) of Waalo, devout followers of Traditional African religion were determined not to relinquish their country to the French so easily. Knowing that their national army and commander had been completely routed, the Tiedos (animists) decided to destroy the infrastructure and the economic base that the French as well as the locals depended on - similar to what the Serers of Sine would do four years later following the Battle of Logandème,

Legacy 

Lingeer Ndaté Yalla Mbodj is one of the most famous lingeers of Senegambian dynastic history. She was not a poppet or feeble queen, but a true queen with all the powers of a Brak. In fact, she was the signatory or co-signatory of many official documents between Waalo and France - 1946 all the way to the final days of Waalo. Immortalized in a sketch by David Boilat, she is one of the very few Senegambian precolonial nobles depicted visually. Like her sister  Ndjeumbeut, whom she succeeded in 1846, Ndaté Yalla was famous for three things: her political strength; her marriages and her son Sidia Diop. The French first took notice of her in 1841 when she was the widow of the King - Brak Yerim Mbanick. From the date of her reign, she made it a mission to veto everything the French wanted to implement in her kingdom that she believed was not in her interest. Ndaté Yalla's son Sidia, continued his parents’ anti-colonialist work until he was captured and exiled to Gabon in 1878.

Ndaté Yalla Mbodj, is regarded as a heroine in Senegambian history, and one of the most famous women of 19th century Senegambia. Along with several other African heroines, She played a crucial role in the struggle for African liberation. Oral historians (also known as griots) have recorded her bravery, and she remains a symbol of female empowerment. During her life and afterwards, Ndaté Yalla  was a symbol of resistance against French colonialism. Queen Ndate Yalla Mbodj died in Dagana, where a statue erected in her honor still stands.

Her mother was one of those women who committed martyrdom at Talaata-i-Ndeer in the name of honour by burning themselves alive.

A primary school in Saint-Louis bears her name, as well as one of the taxi-boats that runs from Dakar to Rufisque.

References

Bibliography
Adandé, Alexis; Arinze, Emmanuel; Arinze, E. N.; West African Museums Programme; Museums & urban culture in West Africa,  Published on behalf of the West African Museums Programme in association with the International African Institute [by] James Currey (2002), p. 145-6, 
Adandé, Alexis; Arinze, Emmanuel; Arinze, E. N.; West African Museums Programme; Museums & urban culture in West Africa,  Published on behalf of the West African Museums Programme in association with the International African Institute [by] James Currey (2002), p. 149  
Afrique Histoire U.S., Volume 3, Afrique histoire U.S. (1985), p. 32
Archives nationales du Sénégal 13 G 91, Correspondance des chefs du Waalo, Lettre N°61 adressée à la Linguére Ndaté Yalla par le Gouverneur de Saint -Louis
Barry, Boubacar, Le royaume du waalo, le Sénégal avant la conquête, F. Maspéro (1972), p 261
Barry, Boubacar, Le Royaume du Waalo: le Sénégal avant la conquête, KARTHALA Editions (1985), pp 73, 275–282, 312–30  /   (Retrieved 20 July 2019)
Barry, Boubacar, Senegambia and the Atlantic Slave Trade (editors: David Anderson, and Carolyn Brown ; trans: Ayi Kwei Armah ; contributors: David Anderson, American Council of Learned Societies, Carolyn Brown, University of Michigan. Digital Library Production Service, Christopher Clapham, Michael Gomez, Patrick Manning, David Robinson, Leonardo A. Villalon), Cambridge University Press (1998), pp. 11, 182,   (Retrieved 20 July 2019)
Brigaud, Félix, Histoire du Sénégal: Des origines aux traités de protectorat, Clair-afrique (1964), p 16.
Fauvelle-Aymar, François-Xavier; Bertrand, Hirsch; Les ruses de l'historien: Essais d'Afrique et d'ailleurs en hommage à Jean Boulègue, KARTHALA Editions (2013), p. 240,   (Retrieved 20 July 2019)
Le Mois en Afrique, Numéros 235 à 246, Le Mois en Afrique (1985), p. 148
M'bayo, Tamba Eadric, African Interpreters, Mediation, and the Production of Knowledge in Colonial Senegal: The Lower and Middle Senegal Valley, Ca. 1850s to Ca. 1920s, Volume 2. Michigan State University. History (2009), p. 208
Messiant, Christine Premières dames en Afrique, KARTHALA Editions (2004), p. 1908,   (Retrieved 21 July 2019)

Sarr, Alioune, Histoire du Sine-Saloum. Introduction, bibliographie et Notes par Charles Becker, BIFAN, Tome 46, Serie B, n° 3–4, 1986–1987, pp. 28–30
Seye, El Hadji Amadou, Walo Brack, Les éditions Maguilen (Dakar, 2007), p. 204
« Wade, Amadou, Chronique du Waalo, commenté par Vincent Monteil, 1966 » [in] Sall, Ibrahima Abou, Mauritanie du Sud: conquêtes et administration coloniales françaises, 1890–1945, KARTHALA Editions (2007), p 49, note 20.   (Retrieved 20 July 2019)
West African Museums Programme, International African Institute, Bulletin, Issue 7,  International African Institute, London School of Economics (1997), p. 35

External links 
 Correspondence of Ndate Yalla Mbodj to the French Governor of Senegal

Senegalese royalty
Serer royalty
Wolof people
Fula people
1810 births
1860 deaths
Lingeer
19th-century rulers in Africa
African women in war
History of Senegal